Kevin Scott Allen (born 20 March 1957) is an American stage, film, and television actor.

Early life and career
Born in Washington, D.C., Allen grew up in California, Virginia, North Carolina, and New Jersey. He was educated at the Hun School of Princeton and Collège Champittet in Switzerland, where he learnt to speak French fluently, and then studied theatre and dramatic arts at the University of Redlands, California. 

In 1979, at the Globe Theatre on Broadway, Los Angeles, Allen played Buckingham in Henry VI, Part 2 and Clifford in Henry VI, Part 3. An early television appearance came in the Otherworld episode “The Zone Troopers Build Men” (1985).

Films
Little Heroes, Part 3 (2002)
Le Petoname: Parti Avec (2005) as Dr Baudouin
Abe and Bruno (2006) as Sheriff Kilgore
Charlie Valentine (2009) as Marko
About Scout (2015) as Ride Operator 
Stalked by My Mother (TV movie, 2016), as Nick Fox
Puppet Master XI (2017) as Sturmbannführer
In Full Bloom (2019) as Vincent Warren

Theatre
Henry VI, Part 2 (Globe Theatre, Broadway, Los Angeles, 1979), as Buckingham
Henry VI, Part 3 (Globe Theatre, Broadway, Los Angeles, 1979), as Clifford
In a Northern Landscape (1983) by Timothy Mason (Cast-at-the-Circle Theatre, Hollywood)
Romeo and Juliet (West Coast Ensemble, 1992), as Romeo
Angels Twice Descending (Hudson Theatre, 1995)
Electricity (Two Roads Theatre)
Martin: Duty Calls by Roy Parker (Acme Theatre, 2018)
Dr. Anonymous (Zephyr Theatre, 2014)
Dreambook (Los Angeles Theatre Center)
The King and I (Wolf Trap Theatre)

Television
Bearcats! (1971) as Town boy
Otherworld: The Zone Troopers Build Men (1985) as Brindle
Homefront (1991–1993) as Ed
Star Trek: Deep Space Nine, "What You Leave Behind" (1999) as Jem’Hadr 
Alias (2005) as French Policeman
Prison Break (2009) as Inmate
Famously Afraid (2019) as Ty Pennington 
Extreme Measures (2019) as Older Tom Egley
Station 19 (2020) as Henry

Publication
Kevin Scott Allen, Conquering the Film and Television Audition (CreateSpace Independent Publishing, 2015)

Notes

External links
Kevin Scott Allen, IMDb
Kevin Scott Allen, nowcasting.com

1957 births
American male film actors
American male television actors
American male stage actors
Hun School of Princeton alumni
Living people
University of Redlands alumni
Collège Champittet alumni